The 1996 Fed Cup was the 34th edition of a competition between national teams in women's tennis. The final took place at Boardwalk Hall in Atlantic City, New Jersey in the United States on 28–29 September, with the United States defeating Spain to give the USA their 15th title.

World Group

Draw

World Group play-offs

The four losing teams in the World Group first round ties (Argentina, Austria, Germany and South Africa), and four winners of the World Group II ties (Belgium, Czech Republic, Netherlands and Slovakia) entered the draw for the World Group play-offs.

Date: 13–14 July

World Group II

The World Group II was the second highest level of Fed Cup competition in 1996. Winners advanced to the World Group play-offs, and loser played in the World Group II play-offs.

Date: 27–28 April

World Group II play-offs

The four losing teams from World Group II (Australia, Bulgaria, Canada and Indonesia) played off against qualifiers from Zonal Group I. Two teams qualified from Europe/Africa Zone (Croatia and Switzerland), one team from the Asia/Oceania Zone (South Korea), and one team from the Americas Zone (Chile).

Date: 13–14 July

Americas Zone

 Nations in bold advanced to the higher level of competition.
 Nations in italics were relegated down to a lower level of competition.

Group I 
Venue: Club Palestino, Santiago, Chile (outdoor clay)

Dates: 22–28 April

Participating Teams

Group II
Venue: Santo Domingo, Dominican Republic (outdoor clay)

Dates: 6–12 May

Participating Teams

Asia/Oceania Zone

 Nations in bold advanced to the higher level of competition.
 Nations in italics were relegated down to a lower level of competition.

Group I
Venue: 700 Years Anniversary Complex, Chiang Mai, Thailand (outdoor hard)

Dates: 21–24 February

Participating Teams

Group II
Venue: 700 Years Anniversary Complex, Chiang Mai, Thailand (outdoor hard)

Dates: 19–24 January

Participating Teams

 
 
 
 Pacific Oceania

Europe/Africa Zone

 Nations in bold advanced to the higher level of competition.
 Nations in italics were relegated down to a lower level of competition.

Group I
Venue: La Manga Club, Murcia, Spain (outdoor clay)

Dates: 22–24 April

Participating Teams

Group II
Venue: Ramat HaSharon, Israel (outdoor hard)

Dates: 25–30 March

Participating Teams

External links 
 Fed Cup

 
Billie Jean King Cups by year
Fed Cup
1996 in women's tennis
Tennis tournaments in New Jersey